Michael Muller (born 26 November 1965 in Delta, British Columbia) is a Canadian former field hockey player who competed in the 1988 Summer Olympics.

References

External links
 

1965 births
Living people
Canadian male field hockey players
Olympic field hockey players of Canada
Field hockey players at the 1988 Summer Olympics
Pan American Games silver medalists for Canada
Field hockey players at the 1991 Pan American Games
People from Delta, British Columbia
Pan American Games medalists in field hockey
Medalists at the 1991 Pan American Games